Ashleigh Fay Pittaway (born 23 May 2000 in Munich) is a former German-British skeleton racer who competed on the Skeleton World Cup and Europe Cup circuits.  She started racing in 2011 in Germany while a student, and joined the national team in 2015.  Her personal coach was Danny Holdcroft, and she used a BlackRoc sled.  She won a gold medal in the 2016 Winter Youth Olympics in Lillehammer. She also made her World Cup debut in 2016, at Königssee, where she finished 15th. She retired from competitive racing in September 2021, ahead of the 2022 Winter Olympics.

World Cup results
All results are sourced from the International Bobsleigh and Skeleton Federation (IBSF).

References

External links
 Ashleigh Pittaway at the British Bobsleigh & Skeleton Association (archived)
 
 
 

2000 births
British female skeleton racers
People educated at Monkton Combe School
Living people
Skeleton racers at the 2016 Winter Youth Olympics
Youth Olympic gold medalists for Great Britain